Colt Comrades is a 1943 American Western film directed by Lesley Selander and written by Michael Wilson. The film stars William Boyd, Andy Clyde, Jay Kirby, Teddi Sherman, Victor Jory, George Reeves and Douglas Fowley. The film was released on June 18, 1943, by United Artists.

Plot
Hoppy, Johnny Travers and California Carlson buy 50% of a ranch. The ranch is owned by siblings who haven’t been able to pay their extravagant water bill so the ranch is almost in foreclosure.

Hoppy and comrades quit the US Marshal Service. The local land baron (Victor Jory) owns the whole valley’s water rights. He also controls the cattleman’s association.

But...instead of paying the water bill, California invests in oil drilling. Both sets of partners feel they will lose the ranch. In the end the oil drilling pays off in water and the ranch is saved.

Cast 
William Boyd as Hopalong Cassidy
Andy Clyde as California Carlson
Jay Kirby as Johnny Travers
Teddi Sherman (billed as Lois Sherman) as Lucy Whitlock 
Victor Jory as Jebb Hardin
George Reeves as Lin Whitlock
Douglas Fowley as Henchman Joe Brass
Herbert Rawlinson as Rancher Varney
Earle Hodgins as Wildcat Willie
Robert Mitchum as Dirk Mason

References

External links 
 

1943 films
American black-and-white films
1940s English-language films
Films directed by Lesley Selander
United Artists films
American Western (genre) films
1943 Western (genre) films
Hopalong Cassidy films
Films with screenplays by Michael Wilson (writer)
Films scored by Paul Sawtell
1940s American films